The Progressive Liberal Party may refer to:
Progressive Liberal Party, a political party in the Bahamas
Progressive Liberal Party (Bulgaria), a defunct political party in Bulgaria
Progressive Liberal Party (Saint Kitts and Nevis), a defunct political party in St Kitts and Nevis
Progressive Liberal Party (Venezuela), a defunct political party in Venezuela